During the 2000–01 season, SV Werder Bremen played in the 1. Bundesliga, the highest tier of the German football league system.

Season summary
Werder Bremen's progress under Thomas Schaaf continued and they climbed to 7th place in the final Bundesliga table.

First team squad
Squad at end of season

Left club during season

References

Notes

SV Werder Bremen seasons
Werder Bremen